Klingnau railway station is a railway station in the municipality of Klingnau, in the Swiss canton of Aargau. It is an intermediate stop on the standard gauge Turgi–Koblenz–Waldshut line of Swiss Federal Railways.

Services
The following services stop at Klingnau:

References

External links 
 
 

Railway stations in the canton of Aargau
Swiss Federal Railways stations